Eduardo Falla Solano Airport  in  is a domestic airport serving the municipality of San Vicente del Caguán in the Caquetá Department of Colombia.

The San Vicente Del Caguan VOR-DME (Ident: SVC) and non-directional beacon (Ident: SVC) are located on the field.

Airlines and destinations

Accidents and incidents
On 17 October 1971, Douglas C-47A HK-595 of Aerolíneas TAO crashed on take-off, killing 19 of 21 people on board. The aircraft was operating a domestic non-scheduled passenger flight although it was only certified to carry freight and three crew.

See also
Transport in Colombia
List of airports in Colombia

References

External links 
OpenStreetMap -  San Vicente
OurAirports -  San Vicente
FallingRain -  San Vicente Airport

Airports in Colombia
Buildings and structures in Caquetá Department